The canton of Meine au Saintois is an administrative division of the Meurthe-et-Moselle department, northeastern France. It was created at the French canton reorganisation which came into effect in March 2015. Its seat is in Vézelise.

It consists of the following communes:

Aboncourt
Affracourt
Allain
Allamps
Autrey
Bagneux
Bainville-aux-Miroirs
Barisey-au-Plain
Barisey-la-Côte
Battigny
Benney
Beuvezin
Blénod-lès-Toul
Bouzanville
Bralleville
Bulligny
Ceintrey
Chaouilley
Clérey-sur-Brenon
Colombey-les-Belles
Courcelles
Crantenoy
Crépey
Crévéchamps
Crézilles
Diarville
Dolcourt
Dommarie-Eulmont
Étreval
Favières
Fécocourt
Forcelles-Saint-Gorgon
Forcelles-sous-Gugney
Fraisnes-en-Saintois
Gélaucourt
Gémonville
Gerbécourt-et-Haplemont
Germiny
Germonville
Gibeaumeix
Goviller
Grimonviller
Gripport
Gugney
Hammeville
Haroué
Houdelmont
Houdreville
Housséville
Jevoncourt
Lalœuf
Laneuveville-devant-Bayon
Lebeuville
Lemainville
Leménil-Mitry
Mangonville
Marthemont
Mont-l'Étroit
Mont-le-Vignoble
Moutrot
Neuviller-sur-Moselle
Ochey
Ognéville
Omelmont
Ormes-et-Ville
Parey-Saint-Césaire
Pierreville
Praye
Pulney
Quevilloncourt
Roville-devant-Bayon
Saint-Firmin
Saint-Remimont
Saulxerotte
Saulxures-lès-Vannes
Saxon-Sion
Selaincourt
Tantonville
Thélod
They-sous-Vaudemont
Thorey-Lyautey
Thuilley-aux-Groseilles
Tramont-Émy
Tramont-Lassus
Tramont-Saint-André
Uruffe
Vandeléville
Vannes-le-Châtel
Vaudémont
Vaudeville
Vaudigny
Vézelise
Viterne
Vitrey
Voinémont
Vroncourt
Xeuilley
Xirocourt

References

Cantons of Meurthe-et-Moselle